Chirimiri Coalfield is located in manendragarh-chirmiri-bharatpur district in the Indian state of Chhattisgarh in the valley of the Hasdeo River, a tributary of the Mahanadi.

Other coalfields
There are several other coalfields in the region. Sonhat Colliery lies north-east of Chirimiri.

History
Tata Iron and Steel Company initiated prospecting of coal but no mining was carried out by them. The Chirimiri colliery was opened in 1930 (production started in 1932), New Chirimiri colliery came up in 1942, Pure Chirimiri colliery in 1945, and North Chirimiri colliery in 1946. Subsequently, New Chirimiri Pondi Hills, West Chirimiri, Duman Hill and Korea collieries started operating. Coal production rose from 264,000 tonnes in 1933 to 3,162,500 tonnes in 1980.

The collieries in Chirimiri Coalfield were owned by several companies and owners such as Chirimiri Colliery Company Pvt. Ltd., Dababhoy's New Chirimiri Ponri Hill Company (Private) Limited, United Collieries Limited, K.N. Dhady and Indra Singh & Sons (Private) Limited. These were nationalized in 1973.

The Coalfield
Chirimiri Coalfield is a part of Central India Coalfields. The latter is spread over the districts of Surguja, Koriya (both in Chhattisgarh), Shahdol and Umaria (both in Madhya Pradesh). There are fourteen coalfields in this group, namely Korar, Umaria, Johilla, Sohagpur, Sonhat, Jhilimili, Chirimiri, Sendurgarh, Koreagarh, Damhamunda, Panchbahini, Hasdeo-Arand, Lakhanpur and Bishrampur. The deposits are at a depth of 0–1200 meters. Therefore, extraction is mainly amenable to underground mining except a few blocks in eastern part of these coalfields which have opencast potential.

Total reserves in Chirimiri coalfield have been estimated to be around 312.11 million tonnes.

According to Geological Survey of India reserves of non-coking coal up to a depth of 300 m in Chirimiri Coalfield was 362.16 million tonnes.

Transport
Chirimiri is connected to Anuppur  by the  Annupur-Chirimiri  branch line in 1939.

From Bilaspur, it is 180 by road, and 237 km by train.

References

Coalfields of India
Energy in Chhattisgarh
Koriya district
Mining in Chhattisgarh